Charles Howland Hammatt Billings (1818–1874) was an artist and architect from Boston, Massachusetts.

Among his works are the original illustrations for Uncle Tom's Cabin (both the initial printing

and an expanded 1853 edition),

the National Monument to the Forefathers, the Civil War monument in Concord, Mass.,  and the 19th-century granite canopy (since replaced) for the Plymouth Rock memorial. He worked for some years with his brother Joseph Edward Billings, also an architect.

He was the artist of one of the well-noted portrayals of the Battle of Lexington.

Selected designs
 Wesleyan Building, Boston (Bromfield Street), 1870
 College Hall, the original structure at Wellesley College, 1871–1875, destroyed by fire in 1914
 Tremont Street Methodist Episcopal Church
 Boston Museum (theatre)
 National Monument to the Forefathers

Image gallery

Notes

Further reading

 M.M. Ballou. Life story of Hosea Ballou: for the young. Boston: A. Tompkins, 1854. Illustrations by Billings. Internet Archive
 

O’Gorman, James F. Hammatt Billings, in The Private Library Autumn 1994, published by the Private Libraries Association
 
 Chapter One includes a biography of Billings

External links
 
 
 

1818 births
1874 deaths
American illustrators
Architects from Boston
Artists from Boston
19th-century American architects